Ayfūʿ Alaʾ is a sub-district located in the Shar'ab as-Salam District, Taiz Governorate, Yemen. Ayfūʿ Alaʾ had a population of 9,853 according to the 2004 census.

Villages
Al-haql Al'alaa village.
Di Malih village.
Al-muhabil village.
Al-ma'ar village.
Mushimah village.
Al-duwaf village.
Ma'ayin village.
Darab village.
Al-kabab village.

References

Sub-districts in Shar'ab as-Salam District